Negros Museum is a privately owned provincial museum situated in the Negros Occidental Provincial Capitol Complex in Bacolod, Philippines. The structure was built in 1925 as the Provincial Agriculture Building.

History
Opened on March 16, 1996, the museum is formerly housed in the Provincial Capitol, which was reverted for government use 2003. Since then, the exhibits have been transferred to the former Provincial Agriculture Building. As a courtesy payment, Negros Cultural Foundation, the management running the Negros Museum, currently pays the Provincial Government a rent of  only, for minimum compliance under law.

Exhibits
The museum is the first in its kind to not house precious archaeological artifacts, but rather was designed to display Negrense lifestyle and society, which includes old furnishings and loaned items from ancestral houses. It also includes art exhibits and expositions from different local artists and foreign artists resident in Negros Island Region. Art training and seminars are also conducted inside the museum.

Museum cafe
Negros Museum Cafe serves the needs of museum goers and walk-in guests, situated in the West Annex of the museum. It includes a separate entrance, which includes an open-air and an in-house station occasionally used for small theater plays and art exhibitions.

References

Art museums and galleries in the Philippines
Buildings and structures in Bacolod
Tourist attractions in Bacolod
Tourist attractions in Negros Occidental
Juan M. Arellano buildings